Divinity is a Canadian heavy metal band from Calgary, Alberta. They are currently unsigned to any major labels but have been signed in the past to Nuclear Blast and Candlelight. Formed in late 1997 by Sean Jenkins and James Duncan, the band name came from a lyric from the song Domination by Pantera - "A now blacked heart is reaching out in divinity."

The band released their first EP in 2002, and their first album, Allegory, in 2007, the latter picked up by Nuclear Blast for release in 2008. Second album The Singularity followed in 2009, and was reissued a year later by Candlelight Records.

They went on to release a series of three EPs between 2013 and 2017. These were compiled on the 2017 album The Immortalist.

Discography

Albums
Allegory (2008), self-released - reissued (2008), Nuclear Blast
The Singularity (2009), self-released - reissued (2010), Candlelight

Compilations
The Immortalist (2017)

EPs
Intensify (2002)
The Immortalist, Pt. 1: Awestruck (2013)
The Immortalist, Pt. 2: Momentum (2016)
The Immortalist, Pt. 3: Conqueror (2017)

References

External links

Canadian heavy metal musical groups
Musical groups established in 1997
Musical groups from Calgary
1997 establishments in Alberta